Aerospike Database is a flash memory and in-memory open source distributed key value NoSQL database management system, marketed by the company also named Aerospike.

History
Aerospike was first known as Citrusleaf. In August 2012, the company - which had been providing its database since 2010 - rebranded both the company and software name to Aerospike. The name "Aerospike" is derived from the aerospike engine, a type of rocket nozzle that is able to maintain its output efficiency over a large range of altitudes, and is intended to refer to the software's ability to scale up. In 2012, Aerospike acquired AlchemyDB, and integrated the two databases' functions, including the addition of a relational data management system. On June 24, 2014, Aerospike was opensourced under the AGPL 3.0 license for the Aerospike database server and the Apache License Version 2.0 for its Aerospike client software development kit.

Release history

Features
Aerospike Database is modeled under the shared-nothing architecture and written in C. It operates in three layers: a data storage layer, a self-managed distribution layer, and a cluster-aware client layer. 

Aerospike uses hybrid memory architecture: the database indices are stored fully in main random-access memory, while the data is stored on a persistent device using the data layer. The data layer stores the data in solid-state drive, NVMe or Persistent memory. Reading the data is done using a direct access to the record position on disk using a direct pointer from the primary index, and data writes are optimized through large block writes to reduce latency. This architecture to fetch all records from the persistent device and void the use of data cache. Aerospike also provides the ability to store the data fully in RAM, thus acting as an in-memory database. In that case, data would be persisted to either SSD, NVMe, PMEM or traditional rotational media. 

Aerospike provides single-record ACID transactions. The distribution layer is responsible to replicate the data across nodes to ensure the durability and immediate consistency properties of the transaction. This allows the database to remain operational even when an individual server node fails or is manually removed from the cluster. Since version 4.0 (2018), Aerospike Database can be configured both as Available and Partition-tolerant (AP) or Consistent and Partition-tolerant (CP) under the CAP theorem.

The client cluster-aware layer is used to track the cluster configuration in the database, and manages client direct communications to all the nodes in the cluster. The clustering is done using heartbeats and Paxos based gossip protocol algorithm.

The software employs two sub-programs that are codenamed Defragmenter and Evictor. Defragmenter removes data blocks that have been deleted, and Evictor frees RAM space by removing references to expired records.

References

External links

NoSQL
Key-value databases
Document-oriented_databases
Structured storage
Databases
Distributed data stores
Distributed computing architecture
Client-server database management systems
Free database management systems
Software using the GNU AGPL license